In China, the Two Sessions is the collective term for the annual plenary sessions of the National People's Congress (the national legislature) and of the Chinese People's Political Consultative Conference (the national political advisory body), which are both held every spring at the Great Hall of the People in Beijing around the same time.

See also 
 Politics of the People's Republic of China
 National People's Congress
 Chinese People's Political Consultative Conference

References

External links 
 All China Lianghui Report 2008 (in Chinese: NCP and CPPCC)

Politics of China